Brett Leonard Climo (born 26 September 1964) is an Australian actor and comedian best known for his television soap opera roles, but has also appeared in films (feature-length and made-for-TV features). He is best known roles include in productions: Sons and Daughters, A Country Practice, The Flying Doctors and A Place to Call Home and the movie Archer.

Filmography

Film

Television

External links
 
 Brett Climo interview
 The Flying Doctors cast - Brett Climo

21st-century Australian male actors
Australian male television actors
1964 births
Living people
20th-century Australian male actors